Acrolophus uncigera is a moth of the family Acrolophidae. It is found in Colombia.

References

Moths described in 1887
uncigera